Cecil Hubert Dixon (born 28 March 1935) is an English former professional footballer. A winger, he joined Newport County in 1957 from Cardiff City and went on to make 107 appearances for Newport, scoring 15 goals before finishing his career at Northampton Town.

Career
Dixon began his career at his home town club Trowbridge Town. In 1954 he joined First Division side Cardiff City, becoming the first Trowbridge player to ever sign for a Division One club, but struggled to force his way into the side, mainly due to the presence of Gordon Nutt, Mike Tiddy and Brian Walsh, scoring his only goal during a 2–1 defeat to Birmingham City in November 1955. After three years at Ninian Park, Dixon joined Newport County in 1957. Finishing his professional career after one season with Northampton Town, he emigrated to Australia in 1963.

References

1935 births
Living people
People from Trowbridge
English footballers
Trowbridge Town F.C. players
Cardiff City F.C. players
Newport County A.F.C. players
Northampton Town F.C. players
English Football League players
Association football midfielders